Bloody Point is a headland in Trinity Palmetto Point Parish, Saint Kitts. The Stone Fort or Bloody River runs towards Bloody Point. In 1626, European colonists massacred 2,000 Kalinago people at Bloody Point.

References

Landforms of Saint Kitts and Nevis
Trinity Palmetto Point Parish
Headlands of North America